Aluva (also known by its former name Alwaye) is a region in Kochi City in Kerala, India. A major transportation hub, with easy access to all major forms of transportation, Aluva acts as a corridor which links the highland districts to the rest of Kerala. Cochin International Airport at Nedumbassery is 11.7 km from Aluva. Aluva is accessible through rail (Aluva railway station), air (Cochin International Airport), metro (Kochi Metro) along with major highways and roadlines. Aluva KSRTC bus station is an important transport hub in Kerala and one of the busiest stations in central part of the state.

Aluva, home to the summer residency of the Travancore royal family–the Alwaye Palace-is also famous for the Sivarathri festival celebrated annually at the sandbanks of Periyar. The Advaita Ashrams in Aluva founded in 1913 by Sree Narayana Guru, one of India's greatest social reformers, adds to the cultural significance of the region. Today, despite being a part of the city as well as the Kochi urban agglomeration, Aluva is still only an autonomous municipality with its civic administration conducted by Aluva Municipal Council, primarily because Kochi Corporation has not expanded its limits for over 53 years.

Aluva also serves as the administrative centre of the Aluva taluk. Villages from Mukundapuram, Kanayannur, Kunathunad and North Paravur taluks were combined to form Aluva Taluk in 1956.The headquarters of the District Police Chief of Ernakulam Rural Police District, Superintending engineer, PWD (Roads) and of the District Educational Officer, Aluva are also located there. It is the northern starting point of Kochi Metro rail's first phase which began its operations in June 2017, as well as Kochi city bus network. The Metro station is at Bypass, Aluva.

History

Archaeologists have found evidence of settlements in Aluva as far back as 250 BC. The place used to be a continuous area of land spread across Kakkanad and Alangad; historians have recorded that it was so up to AD 1341. The town, by then thickly populated, became a holiday resort and a centre of commerce.  Mangalappuzha, a branch of Periyar which bifurcates at Aluva was known to be the nerve centre of trade and commerce in this part of South India. Before Indian independence, Aluva was part of the Kingdom of Travancore and was the official summer residence of the royal family.

The etymology of the name of the town of Aluva has been the subject of speculation for centuries. One of the more accepted version relates to the story of Hindu god Shiva drinking the Kalakootam poison to save the world. It is said that Shiva with the poison 'Alam' in his mouth 'Vaa' was made into a deity which was then rested in a temple in Aluva. The Sivarathri festival for which the town is famous for is celebrated in the honour of Shiva.  In the twentieth century, when there was a community of Jews in Cochin, some used to have holiday homes in Aluva on the banks of the River Periyar. It also has a name "gate way to east"

Politics
Aluva is a constituency in the Kerala Legislative Assembly. The Aluva assembly constituency is part of the Chalakudy (Lok Sabha constituency). Anwar Sadath is the MLA of Aluva. It is part of Chalakudy (Lok Sabha constituency). Benny Behanan is the MP in this constituency.

Administratively, Aluva is a municipality. The current municipal council is ruled by Indian National Congress Party, led by M.O. John who was elected in December 2020. Previously it was led by Lissy Abraham (2015–2020) and M.T Jacob (2010–2015)

Travel 
Aluva is well connected by air, road and rail from all parts of the country

By Air 
Cochin International Airport is 15 km from the town center. Regular domestic and international connections are available from the airport.

By Train 
Aluva railway station (IR Code: AWY)  is an
A graded railway station in Kerala, and is the third busiest railway station in Kochi city after Ernakulam Junction railway station and Ernakulam Town railway station. All passenger, express trains bound to southern Kerala do have a stop in this station. Some leaflets/websites still refer the town's old name (Alwaye).There is also a small railway station near Aluva named Chowara with a 4 km distance from this railway station.

By Metro

Kochi Metro phase 1 starts from Aluva Bypass and currently operates till Pettah. Upon completion of phase 1, it will be further extended to Tripunithura railway station. The project was started in mid of 2013 and commenced its operations in 2017.

The metro system's third phase proposes to extend this line further north from Aluva to the northern suburb Angamaly connecting Cochin International Airport.

By Bus 

Rajiv Gandhi Central Bus Station is one of the largest private Bus terminals in Kochi and Kerala. Aluva KSRTC bus station is also an important bus station in the central Kerala. Apart from this, daily passenger bus of Karnataka RTC and Tamil Nadu's SETC do connect from places like Mysore, Mangalore, Bangalore, Trichy, Coimbatore, Salem, Palani, Kodaikanal etc.

Privately operated Inter-state bus to Bangalore, Chennai, Mysore, Mumbai etc. do have stops in various points of Aluva.

This bus stand also acts as an important node for Kochi city buses, with intra-city services to various parts like Fort Kochi, Tripunithura, Kakkanad, etc. It is a hub for various private bus companies in the city, like Kochi Wheels.

Kochi Metro Rail Limited also runs a bus service from Aluva metro station to Cochin International Airport named Pavan Doot, using an electric bus.

By Ferry 
Aluva is one major stop for National Waterway 3, scheduled to open by August 2010 which connects to Thiruvananthapuram in south and Kottapuram (Thrissur) in north.

Tourism 

Tourists would find the Manappuram on the left as a long stretch of sand bank followed by a plain. Sivagiri Ashram has a small temple which worships Sree Narayana Guru. Popular tourist spots include:
 Sivarathri Manappuram (Sree Mahadeva temple)
 Aluva Palace
 Periyar banks
 Municipal Park
 Kunnathery Maqam (Mahlarathul Qadriya)
 Madrasa Noorul Irfan Arabic Collage, Kunnathery
 St. Dominic Syro-Malabar Church
 St John the Baptist CSI Church (Estd 1891)
 Mangalappuzha Major Seminary
 Kadungalloor Sree Narasimha Swamy temple
 Thiruvalloor Sree Mahadeva Temple
 Kunnil sree dharmashastha temple, Kadungalloor
 Cheerakkada Temple
 Chempakassery temple
 Desom Sree Pallippattukavu Bhagavathy Temple
 Desom Sree Ananthapuram Mahavishnu Temple
 Desom Sree Dhattha Anjaneya Temple
 Adwaitha Ashram
 Sree Krishna Temple
 St. Mary's Church Chowara, Aluva
 Parunthuranchi Manappuram Aluva
 Uliyannoor Sree Mahadeva Temple
 Pottachira Sree Krishna Temple
 Thuruthu, a small island in aluva
 Mar Varghese Payyappilly Palakkappilly Museum, Chunangamvely
 Aluva Settu JumaMasjid
 Kunjunnikara Juma Masjid
 Thottumughom Thangal Jaaram
 Thottumughom Padinjare Palli Juma Masjid
 Thevarkadu Sree Mahavishnu-Durga Temple, Near Chowwara Ferry, Aluva
 Thiruvairanikulam Sree Mahadeva Temple
 Janaseva Shishu Bhavan, Aluva
 Sree Kurumbakavu Bhagavathi Temple Edathala
 Pothiyil Sree Narasimha Moorthy -Sreekrishna Swamy Temple
 Aluva Brahmana Samooham Sree Mahaganapathi Dharmashastha Temple, Manappuram
 Thachanaampara Sree Mahadeva Temple
 Edayappuram Panchamoorthi Naga Temple

Culture
The culture scene of Aluva is rich with those who are native of this town and those who have been attracted to it mainly due its proximity to the great river Periyar.

Several popular Malayalam movie songs are dedicated to the river Periyar. Famous poets Changapuzha Krishna Pillai, G. Sankara Kurup and Balachandran Chullikkadu, and critic Kuttipuzha Krishnapilla, and novelist Subash Chandran are from Aluva and lived there. Though not from Aluva area, Vayalar Ramavarma and O.N.V Kurup wrote about Periyar and the town Aluva was an integral part of their paying homage to the most lively river of the state of Kerala, Periyar.

The mimicry comedy revolution that dominated the cultural landscape of Kerala beginning 1980's originated in Aluva by stand-up comedians from that area, though they got larger audience and fans in Kochi and in Malayalam movies later which would make them cultural fixations of Kerala's pop culture. The movie star Dileep is from later part of that era. With Kochi becoming the base for Mollywood, several parts of the city including Aluva has featured in numerous films, like Premam (portraying the erstwhile Aluva town in the 90s and early 2000s), Nizhal etc.

Several newspapers and magazines were published from Aluva during the print era. Continuing with that tradition the first online magazine and blogging platform was also started in Aluva by puzha.com, which continues to exist in the cyberspace.

Notable people
 Dileep (film actor)
 John Abraham (Bollywood actor)
 Nivin Pauly (film actor)
 Amala Paul (film actress)
 Pearle Maaney (film actress, TV host)
 Varghese Payyappilly Palakkappilly
 M. K. Mackar Pillay (industrialist)
 M. M. Abdul Khader (former Advocate General of Kerala)
 M. M. Pareed Pillay (former Chief Justice of Kerala)
 Kalamandalam Haridas
 Sainuddin
 Siju Wilson (film actor)
 N. F. Varghese (film actor)
 Ajmal Ameer (film actor)
 Alphonse Puthren (film director)
 Sharaf U Dheen (film actor)
 Shabareesh Varma (film actor, poet, singer)
 Venu V. Desom (poet)
 Tini Tom (film actor, comedian)
 Sitaraman Sankaranarayana Iyer (nature activist)
 N. K. Desam (poet)
 G.N. Gopal(Indian Chess Grandmaster)
 Krishna Sankar (film actor)
 Dilas (athlete)
Shritha Sivadas (actor)

Business
City Water- residential apartment aluva 

Aluva  is the home of many business headquarters. Aluva is known for its "Aluva Pukayillatha Aduppu" (smokeless stove) invented by the Alwaye Settlement Church many business headquarters. One of the well established private sector bank in India, The Federal Bank has its headquarters in Aluva.

Colleges and schools 
Many educational institutions are located in Aluva.

Colleges

 Union Christian College, Aluva
 St.Xaviers College for Women Aluva
 Bharata Matha College of Commerce and Arts, Aluva
 MES College Marampally, Aluva
 Bharata Mata School of Legal Studies Aluva
 Carmel College of Nursing Nalamile, Aluva
 Al Ameen College Edathala, Aluva
 MES M. K. Mackar Pillay College of Advanced Studies Edathala, Aluva
 KMEA Engineering College Edathala
 YMCA College Edayappuram, Aluva
 Queen Mothers College Aluva
 St Antony's College, Aluva

Schools and other educational institutions
 Nirmala Higher Secondary School
 St Mary's High School
 The Alwaye Settlement Higher Secondary School
 Vidyadhiraja Vidyabhavan Higher Secondary School
 School For The Blind Aluva
 St. Francis Higher Secondary School for Girls
 Government Girls Higher Secondary School Aluva
 Joe Mount Public School
 Al-Ameen International Public School
 KMJ Public School Nochima, Aluva
 Jyothi Nivas Senior Secondary School, Aluva -2
 Jeevass CMI Central School
 SNDP Higher Secondary School
 Technical Higher Secondary School, Aluva
 Christava Mahilalayam Higher Secondary School
 Govt. Boy's Higher Secondary School
 Islamic Higher Secondary School
 Holy Ghost Convent Girls High School
 St. John The Baptist Csi Emhs School
 St. Joseph's UP School
 Sivagiri Vidyaniketan Senior Secondary School
 Al-Hind Public School
 Talent Public School
 Crescent Public School
 Ideal Public School
 God's Own Public School

Transportation

Aluva Railway Station

Aluva Railway Station is a major stop for trains that passes north to south of Kerala. It is the third busiest station in Kochi city, after Ernakulam Junction railway station and Ernakulam Town railway station. The station is important for southern railway because of the number of passengers itself. The commuters and travellers from Idukki district have to use either this station or the Tripunithura railway station for all their train journeys as there is no possible railway in the Idukki topography. There are no trains starting or ending at this station, but there are a lot of trains which stop for considerable duration here.

Aluva Railway Station is situated at the Railway Station Road junction near the KSRTC stand. The KSRTC stand hosts many buses from Ernakulam and a lot of City Low Floor buses, both A/C and non A/C which ensures connectivity to almost all the places in Kerala.

Kochi Metro Rail Limited

Phase 1 of the Kochi Metro Rail Limited, the pride project of Kerala Government, undertaken by DMRC starts from aside Aluva Flyover. Aluva metro station is the northern terminus of the phase 1 line which was open on 19 June 2017. The construction was started on mid of 2013. Kochi Metro is expected to overcome the traffic problems in Aluva – Edappally - Ernakulam road corridor, which is the second busiest road corridor in Kochi after Kundannoor - Edappally section of NH 66. Kochi metro is expected to raise the civil infrastructure of the city. Development of Kochi metro has raised the commercial value of the land, and has largely catalysed Aluva's assimilation into Kochi city.

Aluva Mahadeva Temple 

The Mahadeva Temple is situated at a distance of 1 km from the Marthanda Varma bridge in NH-47. Periyar river splits into two near Aluva railway bridge and after the splitting one part is called Mangalappuzha. Aluva Mahadeva Temple is located on the sand bank in between the Mangalppuzha and Periyar river. Aluva Mahadeva Temple is managed by Travancore Devaswom Board.

The unique feature of Aluva Mahadeva Temple is that the Shivalinga is not enshrined in a Sreekovil. The Swayambhoo Shivalinga installed by Lord Parasurama and worshipped by Lord Sree Rama rises out of the sand banks of the Periyar river. This place is called the Aluva Manal Puram (land with sand).

There are many legends associated with this temple. After installing the Lingam Parasurama built a temple here but was destroyed by a flood. Lord Shiva told him that no temple structure will exist at that place because He does not want a temple structure for protecting the Lingam. Another legend goes like this. The Bhuthaganas of Lord Shiva worshiped the Lingam every night. They decided to construct a temple there. But Lord Shiva told them that they must complete the temple in a single night. Bhuthaganas agreed and started the construction. When the foundation was completed, Lord Vishnu came there, disguised as a cock and crowed to mislead the Bhuthaganas. The Bhuthaganas, fearing that dawn had approached, left the work unfinished. Sri Rama, during his search for Sitha, performed tharpana for Jadayu here. Another legend is associated with Vilwamangalam Swamiyar. One day he visited this place and realised the presence of Lord Shiva and identified the Shiva Linga installed by Parasurama. He started worshipping the Linga and Lord Mahadeva appeared in front of him and told him to start poojas there. Pottayil Ilayathu, Thottathil Nambiar and Idamana Nampoothiri made proper arrangements for Shiva Pooja and Vilwamngalam started the pooja. But there were no vessels to offer Nivedyam. So Vilwamangalam used a Kavungin Pala (aracanut leaf) to offer Nivedyam. Even today the nivedyam is offered in Kavungin Pala and is called Palanivedyam. Later Vilwamangalam and his associates – Ilayathu, Nambiar and Nampoothiri – constructed a temple but it was destroyed by flood in AD 1343. During the monsoon season the whole region gets flooded and the Shivalinga gets submerged in water. So the Ooranma Nampoothiris were decided to construct a small temple on the bank of the river in order to perform poojas during monsoon season. This temple is called Bala Kshetram. It is a fact that though unfinished in nature, this temple has withstood many a flood and still stands as an enigma to the architects, regarding its foundation and structure. The Travancore Devaswom Board authorities constructed a temple structure here some years ago. but the Deva Prasna conducted later revealed that construction of the temple structure is against Lord Shiva's wish.

See also
 Chowara, suburban village situated near Aluva
 Kaprassery, a village nestled in Aluva
 Kunnukara, a village situated 7 kilometres from Aluva
 Kadungalloor, village situated 3 kilometres from Aluva.
 Edathala, village situated 5 kilometres from Aluva.
 Elookkara, a small village situated 3.6 km in Aluva.
 Aluva Sivarathri festival
 Aluva Railway Station
 Aluva West village in aluva
 Aluva East village in Aluva
 Edayappuram, village situated 2.5 kilometres from Aluva
 Keezhmad, suburban village situated 3 kilometres from central Aluva.it is on Perumbavoor KSRTC road.
 Marthanda Varma Bridge
 Mangalapuzha bridge

Location

References

External links
 Remaining Date for Aluva Municipality Election 2020

 Temples in Aluva
 Hanuman temples in kerala
 online pooja booking Kerala
 Temples in Kochi

 
Neighbourhoods in Kochi
Populated places established in 1921
1921 establishments in India